The 2011 OFC U-17 Championship, was the OFC Under 17 Qualifying Tournament, the biennial football championship of Oceania (OFC). It was the 14th edition of the tournament and was held in Albany, North Shore City, New Zealand from 8 to 19 January 2011. New Zealand qualified for the 2011 FIFA U-17 World Cup, in Mexico.

10 teams, divided over two groups, competed for the top position, which gave rights for a spot in the final.

Qualified teams 

 (host nation)

Venues
The tournament is being played at one venue Albany, North Shore City, New Zealand. North Harbour Stadium has a capacity of 25,000.

The tournament was scheduled to be held at Trusts Stadium’s Douglas Field in Henderson but has been moved to Albany’s North Harbour Stadium, the venue of the OFC Women’s Nations Cup 2010 and several other recent OFC tournaments.

Matches

Group stage

Group A

Group B

3rd place

Final

Goal Scorers
8 goals
 Renaldo Nonmeu

6 goals
 Alex Waimora

5 goals
 Jean Kaltak
4 goals
 Neyl Ausu
 Thomas Buscaglia
 Tim Payne
 Solo Kuki
 Tevairoa Tehuritaua
3 goals
 John Bitiai
 Harrison Mala
 Tihoni Yohann
2 goals

 Tyrell Barringer-Tahiri
 Tamaiva Smith
 Twin Tiro
 Akram Hussain
 Narendra Rao
 Al-Taaf Sahib
 Ben Malakai
 Cameron Howieson
 Jordan Vale
 Ken Yamamoto
 Alwin Komolong
 Gabriel Bosi
 Ahonui Tahi
 Tony Kaltak
 Santino Mermer

1 goal

 Ryan Petaia
 Temana Pennycook
 Ant Samuela
 Shane Kumar
 Vineel Naidu
 Losefo Verevou
 Cedric Decoire
 Erwan Djamali
 Ricardo Passil
 Leon Sakilia
 Nathan Buswell
 Ryan Howlett
 Bill Tuiloma
 Rory Turner
 James Wypych
 David Browne
 Jacob Sabua
 Junior Albert
 Dickson Bua
 Atana Fa'arodo
 Maeron Fa'arodo
 Jimmy Raramane
 Rainui Aroita
 Tauhiti Keck
 Gianni Manca
 Heremana Teikiteepupuni
 Kinitoni Falatau
 Silakivai Maile
 Michel Coulon
 Mark Ieremia
 George Mahit
 Daniel Tenene

own goals
 Lalotoa Vaeao (for Fiji)
 Jerry Misimake (for Tahiti)
 Saimone Pahulu (for Solomon Islands)

References

External links
 

Under 17
2011–12 in New Zealand association football
2011
2011
2011 in youth association football